Lee Choon Peng (born 24 October 1966) is an professional Malaysian former darts player.

Darts career

Lee qualified for the 2012 PDC World Darts Championship, where he lost 2–4 in the preliminary round to Germany's Kevin Münch. He represented Malaysia with Amin Bin Abdul Ghani in the 2012 PDC World Cup of Darts and  together they were beaten 2–5 by Ireland in the first round.

Personal life

Lee is a full-time police officer in Kuala Lumpur.

World Championship results

PDC
 2012: Last 72 (lost to Kevin Münch 2–4) (legs)

References

External links

Living people
Malaysian people of Chinese descent
Malaysian darts players
1966 births
Malaysian police officers
Professional Darts Corporation associate players
PDC World Cup of Darts Malaysian team